The Quill Award was an American literary award that ran for three years, from 2005 to 2007. It was a "consumer-driven award created to inspire reading while promoting literacy." The Quills Foundation, the organization behind the award, was supported by a number of notable media corporations, including Reed Business Information, then parent of Publishers Weekly, and NBC Universal Television Stations, along with Parade Magazine, Borders, Barnes & Noble and the American Booksellers Association.

Reed Business Information announced plans to dissolve the awards program in February 2008 and distribute the remaining Foundation funds to non-profit organizations First Book and Literacy Partners. Reed declined to give reasons for the suspension, but the awards had produced little effect on book sales, and the televised ceremonies were criticized for being too long and poorly planned.

Selection process 
Winners were selected through a two-part process involving nomination by industry experts and final selection by consumer votes. To be eligible for nomination, a book had to be published in English during the previous year and be included in at least one industry or sponsor listing. Readers selected the winners from among the five nominees selected by the board for each category. However, for the 2007 edition, the choice by public vote was restricted to book of the year, and winners in other categories were chosen by retailers and librarians.

2007 Quill Award winners 
Book of the year: Angels Fall, Nora Roberts
Debut author of the year: Diane Setterfield, The Thirteenth Tale
Audio book: To Kill a Mockingbird, Harper Lee (read by Sissy Spacek)
Children's illustrated book: Flotsam, David Wiesner
Children's chapter book/middle grade: The Invention of Hugo Cabret, Brian Selznick
Young adult/teen: Sold, Patricia McCormick
General fiction: The Road, Cormac McCarthy 
Graphic novel: Making Comics: Storytelling Secrets of Comics, Manga and Graphic Novels, Volume 7, Scott McCloud
Mystery/suspense/thriller: What the Dead Know, Laura Lippman
Poetry: For the Confederate Dead, Kevin Young
Romance: Angels Fall, Nora Roberts
Science fiction/fantasy/horror: The Name of the Wind, Patrick Rothfuss
Religion/spirituality: Religious Literacy: What Every American Needs to Know - And Doesn't, Stephen Prothero
Biography/memoir: Einstein: His Life and Universe, Walter Isaacson
Business: The No Asshole Rule: Building a Civilized Workplace and Surviving One That Isn't, Robert I. Sutton
Cooking: Joy of Cooking: 75th Anniversary Edition, Irma S. Rombauer, Marion Rombauer Becker, and Ethan Becker
Health/self-improvement: How Doctors Think, Jerome Groopman, M.D.
History/current events/politics: The Assault on Reason, Al Gore
Humor: I Like You: Hospitality Under the Influence, Amy Sedaris
Sports: The Kings of New York: A Year Among the Geeks, Oddballs and Geniuses Who Make Up America's Top High-School Chess Team, Michael Weinreb

 2006 Quill Award winners 
Book of the Year: Don't Make a Black Woman Take off Her Earrings: Madea's Uninhibited Commentaries on Love and Life, Tyler Perry
Debut Author of the Year: Julie Powell for work in Julie & Julia: 365 Days, 524 Recipes, 1 Tiny Apartment KitchenAudio Book: Marley & Me: Life and Love with the World's Worst Dog, John Grogan
Children's Illustrated Book: If You Give a Pig a Party, Laura Joffe Numeroff
Children's Chapter Book/Middle Grade: The Penultimate Peril, Lemony Snicket
Young Adult/Teen: Eldest, Christopher Paolini
General Fiction: A Dirty Job: A Novel, Christopher Moore
Graphic Novel: Naruto, Volume 7, Masashi Kishimoto
Mystery/Suspense/Thriller: Twelve Sharp, Janet Evanovich
Poetry: Amazing Peace: A Christmas Poem, Maya Angelou
Romance: Blue Smoke, Nora Roberts
Science Fiction/Fantasy/Horror: A Breath of Snow and Ashes, Diana Gabaldon
Religion/Spirituality: Mama Made the Difference, T. D. Jakes
Biography/Memoir: Marley & Me: Life and Love with the World's Worst Dog, John Grogan
Business: The Girl's Guide to Being a Boss (Without Being a Bitch): Valuable Lessons, Smart Suggestions, and True Stories for Succeeding as the Chick-in-Charge, Caitlin Friedman and Kimberly Yorio
Cooking: Rachael Ray 365: No Repeats: A Year of Deliciously Different Dinners, Rachael Ray
Health/Self Improvement: It's Not Easy Being Green: And Other Things to Consider, Jim Henson
History/Current Events/Politics: An Inconvenient Truth, Al Gore
Humor: Don't Make a Black Woman Take off Her Earrings: Madea's Uninhibited Commentaries on Love and Life, Tyler Perry
Sports: Get Your Own Damn Beer, I'm Watching the Game!: A Woman's Guide to Loving Pro Football, Holly Robinson Peete
Variety Blockbuster Book to Film: The Devil Wears Prada and its film adaptation, author Lauren Weisberger and director David Frankel

2005 Quill Award winners 

Book of the Year: Harry Potter and the Half-Blood Prince, J.K. Rowling, Mary GrandPré (Illustrator)
Debut Author of the Year: Elizabeth Kostova for The Historian
Audio Book: The Daily Show with Jon Stewart Presents America: A Citizen's Guide to Democracy Inaction, Jon Stewart and the Writers of the Daily Show
Children's Illustrated Book: Runny Babbit: A Billy Sook, Shel Silverstein
Children's Chapter Book/Middle Grade: Harry Potter and the Half-Blood Prince, J.K. Rowling, Mary GrandPré (Illustrator)
Young Adult/Teen: Girls in Pants: The Third Summer of the Sisterhood, Ann Brashares
General Fiction: The Mermaid Chair, Sue Monk Kidd
Graphic Novel: Marvel 1602 Volume I, Neil Gaiman, Andy Kubert and Richard Isanove
Mystery/Suspense/Thriller: Eleven on Top, Janet Evanovich
Poetry: Let America Be America Again: And Other Poems, Langston Hughes
Romance: 44 Cranberry Point, Debbie Macomber
Science Fiction/Fantasy/Horror: The Stupidest Angel: A Heartwarming Tale of Christmas Terror, Christopher Moore
Religion and Spirituality: Peace is the Way: Bringing War and Violence to an End, Deepak Chopra
Biography/Memoir: Chronicles, Vol. 1, Bob Dylan
Business: Freakonomics: A Rogue Economist Explores the Hidden Side of Everything, Steven D. Levitt and Stephen J. Dubner
Cooking: Rachael Ray's 30-Minute Get Real Meals: Eat Healthy Without Going to Extremes, Rachael Ray
Health and Self-Improvement: He's Just Not That Into You: The No-Excuses Truth to Understanding Guys, Greg Behrendt and Liz Tuccillo
History/Current Events/Politics: 1776, David McCullough
Humor: The Daily Show with Jon Stewart Presents America: A Citizen's Guide to Democracy Inaction, Jon Stewart and the Writers of the Daily Show
Sports: Faithful: Two Diehard Boston Red Sox Fans Chronicle the Historic 2004 Season, Stewart O'Nan and Stephen King

The foundation awarded a Quills Corporate Literacy Award to Verizon for its support of literacy programs in the United States.

References

External links 
 
 

Awards established in 2005
Awards disestablished in 2008
American literary awards
2005 establishments in the United States
2008 disestablishments in the United States